John Worland (17 January 1934 – 7 April 2012) was an  Australian rules footballer who played with Geelong in the Victorian Football League (VFL). 

From Winchelsea, Victoria, he was the younger cousin of Don Worland, who also played football for Geelong.

Notes

External links 

1934 births
2012 deaths
Australian rules footballers from Victoria (Australia)
Geelong Football Club players